The 2009 Rice Owls football team represented Rice University in the 2009 NCAA Division I FBS college football season. The Owls, led by 3rd year head coach David Bailiff, played their home games at Rice Stadium in Houston, Texas. Rice finished the season 2–10 and 2–6 in CUSA play.

Schedule

References

Rice
Rice Owls football seasons
Rice Owls football